Jake Andrewartha,  (born 24 December 1989 in Claremont, Australia) is an Australian judoka. He competed at the 2012 London Olympics and the 2014 Commonwealth Games in the +100 kg event.

Junior career 
Jake Andrewartha started judo when he was 9 years old and made it into Australian team in 2004 at the age of 14. He would go on to compete at his first Junior World Championships in 2006, which would then led to his success in the senior division.

Senior career 
Andrewartha would eventually rise to the No.1 ranking in Australia by then end of 2008 at the age of 18, a position that he has held ever since. In 2009, Andrewartha became the youngest Australian to ever win an International Judo Federation World Cup, which was in Samoa.

After a number of consistent results, including a 9th place at the 2010 World Championships in Japan, Andrewartha ultimately qualified for the 2012 London Olympics. At the end of 2012, he became the first Australian to win the Welsh Open.

In 2013, Andrewartha completed another successful year which included 1st place at the Oceania Championships, National Championships, and 2nd place at the Oceania Open in Samoa.

Andrewartha placed 3rd at the 2014 Commonwealth Games in Glasgow.

Professional wrestling career 
In 2016, Andrewartha moved onto a career in professional wrestling, debuting with Melbourne City Wrestling.

References

External links

1989 births
Living people
Australian male judoka
Olympic judoka of Australia
Judoka at the 2012 Summer Olympics
Sportsmen from South Australia
Judoka at the 2014 Commonwealth Games
Australian male professional wrestlers
Commonwealth Games bronze medallists for Australia
Commonwealth Games medallists in judo
Medallists at the 2014 Commonwealth Games